Podlesnoye is a rural locality (a village) and the administrative centre of Podlesnensky Selsoviet, Sterlitamaksky District, Bashkortostan, Russia. The population was 376 as of 2010. There are 3 streets.

Geography 
Podlesnoye is located 29 km north of Sterlitamak (the district's administrative centre) by road. Ishparsovo is the nearest rural locality.

References 

Rural localities in Sterlitamaksky District